Samilp'o station is a railway station in Samilp'o-ri, Kosŏng county, Kangwŏn province, North Korea on the Kŭmgangsan Ch'ŏngnyŏn Line of the Korean State Railway.

History

The station was opened on 1 November 1935 by the Chosen Government Railway, along with the rest of the sixth section of the original Tonghae Pukpu Line from Oegŭmgang (nowadays called Kŭmgangsan Ch'ŏngnyŏn) to Kansŏng (now in South Korea).

References

Railway stations in North Korea